The 1987–88 Segunda División season saw 20 teams participate in the second flight Spanish league. CD Málaga, Elche CF and Real Oviedo were promoted to Primera División. Bilbao Athletic, Hércules CF, Granada CF and Cartagena FC were relegated to Segunda División B.

This season, the league was expanded to 20 teams and the promotion playoff (promoción) returned.

Teams

Final table

Results

Promotion playoff

First Leg

Second Leg

Pichichi Trophy for Top Goalscorers 

Segunda División seasons
2
Spain